Salomone "Moni" Ovadia (born 16 April 1946 in Plovdiv) is a Bulgarian-born Italian actor, musician, singer and theatrical author. He is one of the most highly regarded figures in contemporary Italian culture. His theatrical performances recall the lost world of eastern Jewish culture, its Yiddishkeyt core, with its profound "burden of pain, wisdom and folly". as it was before the devastations of the Holocaust cancelled it, and murdered almost half of the world's speakers of Yiddish.

Life and career

Family background
Ovadia was born in Plovdiv, Bulgaria, in 1946 to a Sephardi Jewish family, His father, a violinist, had Greek-Turkish roots, while the family of his mother, a singer, was of Serbian origin. In March 1943, the 1,500 Jews of Plovdiv, including Ovadia's family, were saved from the Holocaust by the actions of Metropolitan of Plovdiv, Kiril, one of the heads of the Bulgarian Orthodox Church who threatened to throw himself before the train were it to depart with the community's Jews, whom the Nazis planned to deport to a concentration camp. His family's sense of Judaism was restricted to observing key feastdays. They shifted to Italy in 1949 to flee a rise in anti-Semitism in post-war Bulgaria, which had otherwise protected its Jews.

Italy

Ovadia speaks Italian with a Milanese accent. In Milan, he attended its Jewish school. There he was taught to sing Yiddish songs, but only began to learn the language much later, from a Chabad Lubavitch rabbi, after an acquaintance, Rudi Litwak, insisted that, instead of frequenting Milan's Central Synagogue, with its Italian rites, they visit a small synagogue, Beit Shlomo, at Porta Romana, an apartment used as a shul or shtibi where the language was being spoken passionately by elderly Holocaust survivors and that rabbi.

A formative influence in this period, particularly for his interest in Jewish culture, was the mathematician and psychoanalyst Haim Baharier, who had studied under Emmanuel Levinas, and who opened up for him the riches of Yiddish culture. Ovadia graduated in political science and made his debut in the theatre world under Roberto Leydi, as singer and musician in the band Almanacco Popolare.

Artistic career
In 1972, he founded a company, the Gruppo Folk Internazionale, dedicated initially to the study and playing of traditional Italian music, a focus which quickly expanded to embrace traditions of songs and music in the Balkans. He renamed it the Ensemble Havadià in 1978, a name drawn from his remote family origins.

In 1984 Ovadia made his debut as a theatrical actor. In 1986, he produced Dalla sabbia dal tempo ("From sand, from time"), staged in collaboration with his friend from his Jewish lyceum days, Mara Cantoni, with an accompanying orchestra that also plays a role in the spectacle. Here Ovadia adopts his future format, of recitations interleaved by Yiddish songs and music. The unnamed protagonist (Shlomo in the script) is a Bundist émigré from an eastern shtetl in the process of assimilation. The period may be the 30s, and the ambiance either that of Vienna or Paris.

The Polish director Tadeusz Kantor, whom he met in 1983, became an important influence on his work. Throughout the 90s, Ovadia's performances drew rave reviews in Italy, and played a seminal role in the rise of a vogue for Jewish culture in that country. In 1990, he created the Theatre Orchestra, which became a stable component of his theatre, a backing of some 11 musicians. The innovation was perhaps influenced by Max Reinhardt's Gesamtkunstwerk and aspects of pre-war Yiddish theatre. Around this time 1990-1991, he developed the idea of Golem, a cypher for Jewish diasporic identity, which crystallised in 1992 with his production of Oylem Goylem,  Based on H. Leivick's Yiddish play The Golem, Ovadia's version, (Oylem Goylem is Yiddish for "The world is dumb"), skillfully melded satire and klezmer music sung by himself and deploys a range of accents: the Italian parts being recited by a Polish actor while Ovadia himself, when speaking Italian, pronounced it with a species of szmonces, a comic Yiddish accent used by Jewish actors in the interwar years when speaking Polish in cabaret performances. Ovadia and his team then toured Italy, France, Germany and USA with the play. In 2005, the spectacle was broadcast by RAI, Italy state TV.

In 1995, Ovadia wrote Dybbuk, which addresses the Shoah. His treatment drew inspiration from both S. Ansky's Yiddish drama Der Dibbuk and the Yiddish poet (murdered at Auschwitz)  Itzhak Katzenelson's Song of the Murdered Jewish People. Dybbuk has come to be regarded as one of the most important Italian theatrical shows of the period. In the same year, he produced Taibele e il suo demone and Diario ironico dall'esilio, written with Roberto Andò. His following spectacles include Ballata di fine millennio (1996), Pallida madre, tenera sorella (1996), Il caso Kafka ("The Kafka File", 1997, with Andò), Trieste, ebrei e dintorni (1998), Mame, mamele, mamma, mamà... (1998), Joss Rakover si rivolge a Dio (1999), il banchiere errante (2001), L'armata a cavallo (2003).

In The Kafka File, he plays the role of Yitzchak Löwy, whose Yiddish theatre fascinated the Czech writer.
The premier of his Trieste piece, which took place on the eve of the Jewish holiday, Simchat Torah, was full of topical allusion to the Jewish experience of that city, which Ovadia noted drew on the work of his friend Claudio Magris, combined readings of the Torah with Jewish jokes and songs. In the finale, the lights are doused, to symbolize the erasure of that rich culture, which exists only in imaginative reconstructions like his own.

In 2005, he collaborated with the band Modena City Ramblers for their album Appunti partigiani. In 2007, a poll revealed that he was regarded as one of the six most popular cultural figures in Italy.

In 2009, he appeared in the movie Memories of Anne Frank.   In 2010 together with artists from nomadic cultures, such as the especially Roma and Sinti he performed a theatrical piece entitled Rom & Gagè after France took measures to expel its gypsy population.

A long time advocate of the cultural rights of persons with disabilities, on 20 June 2013 Ovadia held for the first time a full representation in Italian Sign Language of "Il registro dei peccati", one of his most famous monologues. The project was commissioned by and held at SoundMakers Festival, the only Italian multidisciplinary art festival fully accessible to persons with sensory disabilities.

Other
In 2016, in an event that was broadcast by RAI Television to an audience of millions, Ovadia was chosen to deliver one of the eulogies at Castello Sforzesco on the occasion of the funeral of Umberto Eco, Italy's most prominent post-war public intellectual and writer. He chose to honour his friend by recounting one of the numerous Yiddish jokes he'd heard from Eco's vast repertoire.

Social philosophy
Ovadia says of himself that he is "proudly extremist", qualifying this by stressing his opposition to any form of violence.  He has been an outspoken opponent of racism, also within Italian society, which, he says, has absolved itself of any sense of guilt for its massacres in Ethiopia, Cyrenaica and ex-Yugoslavia. He received an award from the University of Pavia in October 2007; in his acceptance speech he denounced the treatment of immigrants, especially Roma and Sinti. Ovadia states that his deep affinity for these people reflects his own sense of what being a Jew entails:
In western civilization, no one has been regarded as "the other", "the foreigner", the minority existing outside of its proper place, more than the Rom, the Sinti and the Jews. Yet while, in the wake of the great catastrophe, the Jews have taken their place in the winners'  salon, of those everything about whom is to be duly acknowledged, this has not been done for the Rom and Sinti. Everybody recognizes the word Shoah, no one Porrajmos, which means the devouring: their extermination has yet to be acknowledged in the Europe that produced it.

Relationship to Judaism
He identifies as Jewish and agnostic. His first visit to Israel took place in 1966. His characteristic headdress is not a kippah. His distinctive woolen cap bears close similarities to those worn by Moroccans, a likeness which has often led to Arabs in the street greeting him as one of them. It has, he says, something of the comfort factor of Linus's blanket. In 2013, he broke with the Milan Jewish Community, which he joined out of respect for his parents, after complaining that it had become a propaganda office for Israel, and in protest at what he called attempts to "Israelianize" Judaism. Ovadia is highly critical of Israel and of the double standards used by the United States in sanctioning human rights violations elsewhere, but never against Israel.

In response to the possible impression his comic performances of a constructed stetl "Jew" might feed into anti-Semitic stereotypes, such as that of a putative Jewish greed and Jewish noses, Ovadia has remarked that:
The merit of my success is that I simultaneously satisfy vast categories of people: Jews who love to laugh at themselves, those who feel a sense of guilt for that which happened and finally can laugh at Jews along with a Jew; anti-Semites who see their stereotypes confirmed.

In a learned article penned for Corriere della Sera in defence of Roberto Benigni's Life is Beautiful, panned in some quarters as fabricating a version of the Holocaust and distorting its horror by introducing humour into its narrative of the tragedy, Ovadia documented the importance of the comical in Judaism and Jewish civilization generally, and, in appreciation of Benigni's work, called him "a Jew honoris causa."

Critical reception
The American writer Ruth Gruber, while noting the seminal role Ovadia's work has played in promoting Jewish, especially Eastern European, Jewish culture, adds a reservation:
Ovadia's performances, the image he projects and his immense influence  in Italy illustrate another trap: the risk that Jews themselves can create or buy into or perpetuate Jewish worlds that are just as "virtual" or "absolutely fake" as those created by non-Jews. The world presented by Ovadia, Italy's most visible Jewish cultural figure, had little to do with either the physical image or popular culture of Italy's largely assimilated Jews themselves.

Gruber also notes the apparent contradiction of an Italian Jew using Yiddish, a language never adopted among Jewish communities there, as a vehicle for celebrating the Jewish tradition generally. Though despised by intellectuals of the haskalah, who used it satirically in plays to mock the "backwardness" of their traditional communities, Yiddish nonetheless became in turn, also through theatre, a "civilizing agency par excellence" for the Jewish masses under the stress of modernity.

Influence
Ovadia has had a notable influence on the Neapolitan writer Erri De Luca.

Books
 1996 – Perché no?: L'ebreo corrosivo :it:La nave di Teseo 
 1998 – Oylem Goylem Mondadori 
 1998 – L'ebreo che ride Giulio Einaudi 
 1999 – La Porta di Sion. Trieste, Ebrei e dintorni, Libreria editrice goriziana,
 2000 – Ballata di fine millennio (book and CD)
 2001 (1998?) – Speriamo che tenga – Viaggio di un saltimbanco sospeso tra cielo e terra (a hilarious autobiography)
 2002 – Vai a te stesso
 2005 – Contro l'idolatria
 2007 – Lavoratori di tutto il mondo, ridete – La rivoluzione umoristica del comunismo
 2010 – Il conto dell'Ultima cena – in collaboration with Gianni Di Santo,
 2010 – Introduction to the Italian edition of Yehudi Menuhin's book, Musica e Vita Interiore

Discography 
 1991 Oylem Goylem (Fonit Cetra)
 1995 Dybbuk        (Sensible records)
 2004 Sulla memoria, con Yesh Gvul di Marco Fusi (CNI Audiocoop)
 2011 Oltre i confini – ebrei e zingari, con Moni Ovadia Stage Orchestra, (Promo Music Records/Edel)
 2013 Benvenuti nel ghetto, con gli Stormy Six (BTF)

Notes

Citations

Sources

External links

 
 Official website
 Klezmer Shack: Review of Moni Ovadia / Theaterorchestra
 Il Porto Ritrovato: Moni Ovadia
 Interview with Beth Shlomo
 Homage by Ovadia to Umberto Eco on the occasion of his funeral YouTube 2016

1946 births
20th-century Italian Jews
21st-century Italian Jews
Bulgarian emigrants to Italy
Italian communists
Italian disability rights activists
Italian male singers
Jewish Italian writers
Jewish singers
Living people
Male actors from Milan
Theatre people from Milan
University of Milan alumni